William Rathbone VI (11 February 1819 – 6 March 1902) was an English merchant and businessman noted for his philanthropic and public work. He was an English Liberal politician who sat in the House of Commons variously between 1868 and 1895.

Background and early life
Rathbone was the eldest son of William Rathbone of Greenbank, Liverpool and his wife Elizabeth Greg, daughter of Samuel Greg of Quarry Bank, Cheshire. He was a member of the noted Rathbone family and spent some time with various companies in Liverpool and London before in 1842, becoming a partner in the family company Rathbone Brothers and Co., general merchants of Liverpool. He remained a partner until 1885 and is said to have regarded wealth and business success chiefly as a means to the achievement of public and philanthropic work. He was a Deputy Lieutenant and JP for Lancashire.

Political and philanthropic work
When Rathbone's first wife Lucretia was dying in 1859 she was cared for at home by a private nurse, Mrs Mary Robinson, who had received training at St. Thomas' Hospital London, Seeing the difference a trained nurse could make for a patient in a wealthy household prompted him to pursue bringing such benefits for poor people.   Following a three month experiment with Nurse Robinson providing nursing care in the homes of poor people in one district of Liverpool, he set about creating a philanthropic system of  district nursing for poor people in their homes. The involvement of Florence Nightingale led to a close friendship. In 1862, the Liverpool Training School and Home for Nurses was established, from which basis a district nursing system was implemented in Liverpool through the 1860s and spread throughout the country. His involvement with this scheme also made him aware of the poor state of the workhouse hospitals, and he did much to assist in the reform of nursing in workhouses.

Rathbone was also instrumental in establishing Queen Victoria's Jubilee Institute for Nurses in 1887, which later became The Queen's Nursing Institute. The Institute was founded using money donated by the women of England for Queen Victoria's Golden Jubilee. Its mission was to organise the training and supply of district nurses throughout the British Isles, with the help of regional bodies. District nurses trained under its auspices were given the title Queen's Nurse. Members of the Rathbone family have served as trustees of the charity continuously ever since.

Rathbone was elected as Member of Parliament (MP) for Liverpool in 1868, and sat for the city until 1880. In 1881 he was elected MP for Carnarvonshire and held the seat until 1885. He was then elected MP for Arfon and held the seat until 1895.

Rathbone was closely involved in the formation of University College Liverpool (1882), which later became the University of Liverpool, founding a Professorship in English with his two brothers, and serving as president of the college in 1892. He also played an important part in the establishment of the University College of North Wales in 1884, and served as president from 1891. He was made Freeman of the City of Liverpool on 21 October 1891.

Works

Personal life 

Rathbone married firstly Lucretia Wainwright Gair (c.1823 – 27 May 1859), daughter of Samuel Stillman Gair of Liverpool in 1847. They had five children, but Lucretia died shortly after the birth of the fifth, Ted, who was drowned in a sailing accident on Derwent water in 1886.

Rathbone remarried on 6 February 1862 to Esther Emily Acheson Lyle (c.1832 – 19 March 1918), daughter of Acheson Lyle of Derry. They had six children, including the campaigner and politician, Eleanor Rathbone and Emily Evelyn (Evie) (1865–1954) who married Hugh Reynolds Rathbone.
Rathbone died on 6 March 1902 at his home, Greenbank House in Liverpool.

References

External links 

 
 

1819 births
1902 deaths
British philanthropists
Members of the Parliament of the United Kingdom for Liverpool
Liberal Party (UK) MPs for Welsh constituencies
UK MPs 1868–1874
UK MPs 1874–1880
UK MPs 1880–1885
UK MPs 1885–1886
UK MPs 1886–1892
UK MPs 1892–1895
William
Deputy Lieutenants of Lancashire